Etienne-Panayotis Bito'o (born 5 January 1980 in Lambaréné) is a Gabonese footballer, who is currently playing for US O'Mbilia Nzami.

Career 
In December 2007 he signed a 2-year contract with Georgian side Zestaponi. The offensive midfielder recently playing for Omani clubs, Dhofar F.C. and Al-Nasr (Salalah).

International 
He is a member of the Gabon national football team, he represented his homeland at the 2002 African Cup of Nations in Mali.

In 2010 Bito'o was called up for Gabon for friendly matches against Oman and Saudi Arabia.

References

External links 
Sporthirado

1980 births
Living people
People from Lambaréné
Gabonese footballers
Association football midfielders
AS Mangasport players
FC 105 Libreville players
Gil Vicente F.C. players
Bidvest Wits F.C. players
FC Zestafoni players
Dhofar Club players
Al-Nasr SC (Salalah) players
Missile FC players
Gabon international footballers
Expatriate footballers in Portugal
Expatriate soccer players in South Africa
Expatriate footballers in Georgia (country)
Expatriate footballers in Oman
Gabonese expatriate sportspeople in Portugal
Gabonese expatriate sportspeople in South Africa
Gabonese expatriate sportspeople in Georgia (country)
Gabonese expatriate sportspeople in Oman
21st-century Gabonese people